The Siebel Si 201 was a German air observation post and army cooperation aircraft, designed and built by Siebel.
Evaluated against other types, the Si 201 did not enter production and only two prototypes were built.

Design and development
Designed to meet a requirement for an air observation post and army cooperation aircraft, the Si 201 first flew in 1938. It was evaluated against the Fieseler Fi 156 and Messerschmitt Bf 163.  The Fi 156 was ordered into production and only the two prototype 201s were built.

The Si 201 was a high-wing, braced monoplane with a tailwheel landing gear, powered by an Argus As 10C, mounted above the wing and driving a pusher propeller. It had a boxy, fully glazed forward fuselage with room for a pilot and observer in tandem.

Specifications

See also

References

Notes

Bibliography

 Green, William. Warplanes of the Third Reich. New York, Doubleday, 1970. .

External links

Siebel aircraft
1930s German military utility aircraft
Aircraft first flown in 1938
Single-engined pusher aircraft
High-wing aircraft